The Beigang Tourist Bridge is a footbridge in Lioujiao Township, Chiayi County and Beigang Township, Yunlin County in Taiwan. The bridge crosses over Beigang River.

Features
Comprising three arches, this red and gold steel arch bridge is said to resemble a giant dragon. The bridge can be used by pedestrians and cyclists.

Transportation
The bridge is accessible west from Minxiong Station of the Taiwan Railways.

See also
 Transportation in Taiwan

References

Arch bridges in Taiwan
Bridges in Yunlin County